Joe Lee Griffin Stadium is a baseball venue located in Birmingham, Alabama, USA.  It is home to the Samford Bulldogs college baseball team of the Division I Southern Conference.  It has a capacity of 1,000 spectators.

The facility was extensively renovated in 2000.  It includes locker rooms and offices.

The stadium's street address is 800 Lakeshore Drive in Birmingham.

See also
 List of NCAA Division I baseball venues

References

Samford Bulldogs baseball
College baseball venues in the United States
Baseball venues in Alabama